The Belgian railway line 96 is a railway line in Belgium connecting Brussels to Quévy at the border with France. A railway line then connects Quévy to Paris, France, which forms the old Brussels-Paris railway line. The line is used by TGV, Thalys trains and Eurostar trains between Brussels and Lembeek.

The first section of line 96 opened in 1840 between Brussels and Tubize. The final section between Hautmont and the Belgian-French border was opened in 1858.

The following stations are located on this line:
 Brussels-South
 Forest-South
 Ruisbroek
 Lot
 Buizingen
 Halle
 Lembeek
 Tubize
 Hennuyères
 Braine-le-Comte
 Soignies
 Neufvilles
 Masnuy-Saint-Pierre
 Jurbise
 Erbisoeul
 Ghlin
 Mons
 Cuesmes
 Frameries
 Genly
 Quévy

Accidents 
In 2010, two trains collided on the line 96, near Halle train station, causing 19 deaths.

References

96
96
City of Brussels
Mons
Railway lines opened in 1840
3000 V DC railway electrification